Kathryn Woodard (1969) is an American pianist, scholar, composer, and educator. She was born in Dallas, Texas, the daughter of Christina and George Woodard, a shortwave radio engineer. She is recognized as an interpreter of music by composers from Turkey and East Asia. Her work as an educator has addressed musicians who seek relief from injuries and an increased awareness of the body in motion.

Career
After initial studies in Dallas with noted new music pianist, Jo Boatright, Woodard moved to Munich, Germany where she continued studies with Yasuko Matsuda and later with Gitti Pirner at the University of Music and Performing Arts (Hochschule für Musik). She pursued graduate studies at the University of Cincinnati College-Conservatory of Music with Frank Weinstock and began a focus on piano music by composers outside of the Western tradition. At the same time she began to learn the Alexander Technique to overcome physical limitations in her playing, studying primarily with Barbara Conable.

In 2001 Woodard served as a consultant for Turkish music with the Silk Road Project to help identify composers for the Silk Road Ensemble to commission. From 2000 to 2004 she was adjunct assistant professor at Hunter College, and in 2004 she accepted a position at Texas A&M University in its fledgling music program. Woodard's scholarly research has focused on timbral experiments in piano music and on the works of Turkish composers such as Ahmed Adnan Saygun (1907-1991). More recent presentations have focused on the perception of rhythm and the process of learning rhythms.  In addition to recordings on the New Albion and Albany record labels, she has released two recordings on her own label Sonic Crossroads. This entity is now an educational initiative promoting global piano music to students around the world through publications, classes and assessments. With several publications she has brought the piano music of Turkish composers to a broader audience.

Discography
Ahmed Adnan Saygun: Piano Music, Albany Records 1168 (2010). (Solo recording)
Journeys. With works by Hasan Uçarsu, Ivan Božičević, Kathryn Woodard, Paula Matthusen, Sansar Sangidorj, Eka Chabashvili, and Keiko Fujiie; Sonic Crossroads 02 (2009). (Solo recording)
Silhouettes. With works by Muammer Sun, Kosaku Yamada, Qu Xiao-song, Umar Temor, Dmitri Yanov-Yanovsky; Sonic Crossroads 01 (2008). (Solo recording)
“Four Studies of Peking Opera” for piano and strings by Ge Gan-ru. Recorded with the Shanghai Quartet for the album Lost Style – Ge Gan-ru, New Albion Records 134 (2007).

Compositions
 Impromptus Three pieces for piano (2022)

 The Calm Before... Two pieces for viola and piano (2019)

 Budapest 1919 - Three songs for high voice, clarinet, viola and piano (2016/2019)

 Creepy Suite Six pieces for piano (2019)

 Ancient Omens Three pieces for piano (2018)

 Royal Portraits Four pieces for piano (2014)

 Glimmer - Chamber work for oboe, clarinet, cello and percussion (2010)

 Lyric Suite - A set of improvisations for prepared piano (2008)

References

American women classical pianists
American classical pianists
Living people
Ethnomusicologists
21st-century American pianists
1969 births
Women ethnomusicologists
21st-century American women